The Elbe–Havel Canal is a 56-kilometre-long waterway in Germany. It links Magdeburg, on the River Elbe, with Brandenburg on the River Havel.

Since 2003, the Elbe–Havel Canal has been connected to the Mittelland Canal by the Magdeburg Water Bridge, which crosses above the River Elbe. The Mittelland Canal provides a connection to the west of Germany. To the east, the River Havel connects to the Oder-Havel Canal, and the Elbe–Havel Canal thus forms part of a continuous waterway from the west to Berlin and Poland.

References

Canals in Germany
Canals in Brandenburg
Federal waterways in Germany
Waterways in Germany
CElbeHavel
CElbeHavel